Kootenay Loop is a bus loop in Vancouver, British Columbia, Canada. It is the easternmost major transit exchange in the city of Vancouver, with routes serving Vancouver, Burnaby, North Vancouver and the Tri-Cities.

Structure and location
Kootenay Loop opened on August 20, 1950, and is located on East Hastings Street at its intersection with Kootenay Street. It is near the Pacific National Exhibition grounds and the Second Narrows Bridge to North Vancouver. It is located just northwest of the Burnaby Transit Centre, which houses the public transit buses for Burnaby.

The exchange can handle regular-length diesel buses, articulated buses and electric trolley buses. Part of the exchange is on Hastings Street itself, with the other section (used by the trolley buses) is separated from regular traffic. It is also one of the power stations for the trolleys.

Kootenay Loop used to be a streetcar turnaround as there was no service into Burnaby after 1949. There was a small cafe in the centre until the mid-1950s.

Routes
, the following routes serve Kootenay Loop:

See also
List of bus routes in Metro Vancouver

References

External links

TransLink (British Columbia) bus stations
1950 establishments in British Columbia